Beta globulins are a group of globular proteins in plasma that are more mobile in alkaline or electrically charged solutions than gamma globulins, but less mobile than alpha globulins.

Examples of beta globulins include: 
 beta-2 microglobulin
 plasminogen
 angiostatins
 properdin
 sex hormone-binding globulin
 transferrin

References

External links
 "Examples of Protein Electrophoretograms" at ufl.edu
 

Blood proteins